Surasettikoppa is a village in Dharwad district of Karnataka, India.

Demographics 
As of the 2011 Census of India there were 464 households in Surasettikoppa and a total population of 2,334 consisting of 1,262 males and 1,072 females. There were 280 children ages 0-6.

References

Villages in Dharwad district